Almost two decades after the very first edition of the OTI Festival, Cuba and its member station, the Cuban Institute of Radio and Television debuted in the event in 1991 turning into the very last Latin American country making its debut in the festival.

History
The very first Cuban entry in the contest was "Si todos saben de ti" (If everybody knows about you) performed by Delia Díaz de Villegas, which was moderately successful making it to the top 10.

The following year, Cuba kept on participating in the OTI Song Contest organising a national final from 1992 to 1994 and then, selecting the entrants internally.

The best scoring Cuban entry came in 1995 in the Paraguayan city of San Bernardino with the song "Hoy que no estás" (Today you are not here) performed by Cristina Rebull, which came third in the festival.

The following Cuban competing songs in the contest from 1996 to 2000 were also successful, managing again to reach the top 10.

Due to the short trajectory of Cuba in the OTI Festival, the country never won or hosted the festival which came to an end in 2000.

Contestants
Table key

References 

OTI Festival